The Regiment Carabiniers Prins Boudewijn – Grenadiers is an infantry regiment in the Land Component of the Belgian Armed Forces. The regiment is a part of the Motorized Brigade. This regiment is a Dutch speaking unit.

History

Carabiniers
The 1st Rifles Regiment was formed on September 27, 1830 during the Belgian Revolution. They were equipped with carbines and received the title of Regiment of Carabiniers in 1850. On July 21, 1930, King Albert I decided that the regiment would bear the title of Regiment Carabiniers Prince Baudouin, in honour of his late brother (not to be confused with the king of the same name) who served within its ranks.

Grenadier Regiment

The Grenadier Regiment was founded on May 8, 1837 by King Leopold I. Originally designated as the Regiment of Grenadiers and Voltigeurs, it was created by bringing together the elite companies of each of the twelve regiments of line infantry then in existence. The new unit consisted of four battalions; two of grenadiers and two of voltigeurs. Renamed as the Elite Regiment a year later the unit finally received the designation of Grenadier Regiment by royal command on March 5, 1850.

The new regiment was stationed in the Caserne Prince Albert, in Brussels near the Royal Palace. Today only the monument to the fallen Grenadiers remains of it. In the Hall of Grenadiers the memorabilia and the portraits of the Royal Officers are still kept.

Carabiniers Prins Boudewijn – Grenadiers
As a result of cuts to the army after the Cold War, the Regiment Carabiniers Prins Boudewijn was amalgamated with the 1st Grenadier Regiment on June 27, 1992 in order to form the new Regiment Carabiniers Prins Boudewijn – Grenadiers.  The unit retained its role of mechanised infantry and was stationed in Leopoldsburg. They take part in missions abroad and still have important ceremonial duties.

Today there are approximately 600 Grenadiers of whom 6 are women.

Royal officers

Historically, the regiment had the distinction of having members of the royal family and nobility within its ranks, including:
 King Leopold II
 Prince Baudouin
 King Albert I
 King Leopold III

Today Prince Amedeo of Belgium, Archduke of Austria-Este is officer of the Second Regiment of Grenadiers. Other important officers included Francis Dhanis .

Battle honours
The following honours are displayed on the regiment's standard, they are embroidered in gold on the Belgian Colours.
The current Standard was presented to the Regiment by King Albert II in 1994:

 Campaign 1914-1918
 Antwerpen
 Ijzer
 Tervaete
 Steenstraete
 Westrozebeke
 Passendale 
 Rumbeke
 Battle of Belgium 1940

Ceremonial duties

The regiment provides the Guard of Honour at the following ceremonies:
 the Annual Service for Prince Baudouin, Church of Laeken,
 the Annual Service at the Royal Palace, presentation of the Kings Colours, 15 November,
 11 November Armistice Day.

The grenadiers/carabiniers also provided Guards of Honour at the following occasions:
 Wedding of the Duke of Brabant (1999),
 State Funeral of Prince Boudouin,
 State Funerals of Queen Elisabeth and Queen Astrid,
 State Funeral of King Leopold III,
 Solemn and Royal Funeral of Queen Fabiola (2014).

Organisation

Carabiniers Prins Boudewijn – Grenadiers Battalion comprises:

 HQ staff
 1st Company
 2nd Company   
 3rd Company
 service Company

Lineage

|-style="text-align: center; background: #F08080;"
| align="center" colspan="5"|Lineage
|-
| width="20%" align="center"| 1st Regiment of Carabiniers
| width="20%" align="center"|  Regiment of Carabiniers
| width="20%" align="center"| Regiment Karabiniers Prins Boudewijn
| width="20%" rowspan="2" align="center" |Regiment Carabiniers Prins Boudewijn – Grenadiers
|-
| width="20%" colspan="3" align="center"|1st Regiment of Grenadiers

References

Sources

 
 

Regiments of Belgium
Military units and formations established in 1992
1992 establishments in Belgium
Organisations based in Belgium with royal patronage
Belgian ceremonial units
Grenadier regiments